Paul Tingley (born June 1, 1970) is a Canadian sailor who represented the country at the Paralympics, in sailing keelboat. He is a resident of Halifax, Nova Scotia who became disabled due to a skiing accident at 24. He became interested in sailing through the suggestion of a physiotherapist.

Results

Paralympics
Tingley completed at five Paralympic Games, winning three medals:
 Bronze medal in Sonar at the 2000 Summer Paralympics
 Competed in the 2004 Summer Paralympics
 Gold medal in 2.4 Metre at the 2008 Summer Paralympics
 Competed in the 2012 Summer Paralympics
 Bronze medal in Sonar at the 2016 Summer Paralympics

World Championships
He also won a bronze medal at the 2009 2.4m World Championships (Fort Myers, Florida) and a gold at the 2010 World Championship (Hoorn, Netherlands) competing against both able bodied and disabled sailors.

References

External links 
 
 
 
 

1970 births
Living people
Canadian sailors
Canadian male sailors (sport)
Paralympic sailors of Canada
Paralympic gold medalists for Canada
Paralympic bronze medalists for Canada
Paralympic medalists in sailing
Sailors at the 2000 Summer Paralympics
Sailors at the 2004 Summer Paralympics
Sailors at the 2008 Summer Paralympics
Sailors at the 2012 Summer Paralympics
Sailors at the 2016 Summer Paralympics
Medalists at the 2000 Summer Paralympics
Medalists at the 2008 Summer Paralympics
Medalists at the 2016 Summer Paralympics
Sportspeople from Halifax, Nova Scotia
2.4 Metre class sailors